Renewers of the Church is a title given to some individuals by the Lutheran Book of Worship, a work created by several of the large North American Lutheran denominations in 1978.

It is given only to those individuals who have through their lives and actions significantly contributed to the development and vitality of the Christian church.  The individuals specifically designated by one or more Lutheran churches with this term include:

Johann Konrad Wilhelm Loehe, commemorated on January 2
Antony of Egypt, and Pachomius, commemorated on January 17
Martin Luther, commemorated on February 18
John Wesley, and Charles Wesley, commemorated on March 2
Hans Nielsen Hauge, commemorated on March 29
Olavus Petri, and Laurentius Petri, commemorated on April 19
Julian of Norwich, commemorated on May 8
Nicolaus Ludwig von Zinzendorf, commemorated on May 9
John Calvin, commemorated on May 27
Columba, Aidan, and Bede, commemorated on June 9
Philipp Melanchthon, commemorated on June 25
Birgitta of Sweden, commemorated on July 23
N. F. S. Grundtvig, commemorated on September 2
Francis of Assisi, commemorated on October 4
Teresa of Avila, commemorated on October 15
John of the Cross, commemorated on December 14
Katharina von Bora Luther, commemorated on December 20

References

Lutheran liturgy and worship